Dragan Gugleta (born 17 July 1941) is a Serbian former football manager and player.

Club career
Between 1962 and 1967, Gugleta spent five seasons with OFK Beograd, amassing over 100 appearances in the Yugoslav First League. He was also a regular member of the team that won the Yugoslav Cup in the 1965–66 season. In 1967, Gugleta moved abroad to France and signed with Strasbourg. He spent two seasons with the French club before returning to Yugoslavia. After a season at Olimpija Ljubljana, Gugleta rejoined OFK Beograd.

International career
At international level, Gugleta was capped eight times for Yugoslavia from 1965 to 1966, scoring two goals.

Managerial career
During his managerial career, Gugleta worked for numerous clubs in many countries, including Tunisia, Kuwait, Qatar, and Libya. He was also manager of Rad, leading them to a fourth-place finish in the 1988–89 Yugoslav First League.

Honours
OFK Beograd
 Yugoslav Cup: 1965–66

References

External links
 
 
 

Association football midfielders
Expatriate football managers in Kuwait
Expatriate football managers in Libya
Expatriate football managers in Qatar
Expatriate football managers in the United Arab Emirates
Expatriate football managers in Tunisia
Expatriate footballers in France
FK Borac Banja Luka players
FK Rad managers
Kuwait Premier League managers
Ligue 1 players
NK Olimpija Ljubljana (1945–2005) players
OFK Beograd players
Qadsia SC managers
Qatar SC managers
RC Strasbourg Alsace players
Serbian football managers
Serbian footballers
Sportspeople from Kragujevac
Yugoslav expatriate footballers
Yugoslav expatriate sportspeople in France
Yugoslav First League players
Yugoslav football managers
Yugoslav footballers
Yugoslavia international footballers
1941 births
Living people